Garry Andrew Hocking (born 8 October 1968) is a former Australian rules footballer who played for the Geelong Football Club in the Australian Football League (AFL).

Tough and skilled in equal measure, Hocking was an integral part of Geelong's midfield who was recognized at both club and League level as one of the finest players of the 1990s, winning club best and fairests, All-Australian honours and finishing top three in the Brownlow Medal vote count on four occasions. Recognizable on the field with his curly brown mullet hairstyle and nicknamed "Buddha", Hocking was inducted into the Australian Football Hall of Fame in 2008, and was also named in Geelong's Team of the Century and Hall of Fame.

Since retiring from playing, Hocking has coached at various clubs. He coached  AFL side in 2012 for four games after Matthew Primus was sacked, the Port Adelaide SANFL side, and the  VFL side.

Early years
Hailing from the border town of Cobram in north-eastern Victoria, Hocking was one of three sons born to Les Hocking and his wife Pam. He also has one sister. Les worked as a hairdresser at 'Plugger' Bourke's barber shop, and young Garry served an apprenticeship with him before moving to Geelong.

Playing career
Hocking and elder brother Steve were part of then Geelong coach John Devine's mass recruiting drive which also netted players such as Gavin Exell, Bruce Lindner, Dwayne Russell, Mark Bairstow and Billy Brownless in the mid-1980s.

Hocking made his senior VFL debut in the 1987 Round 3 match against  at Kardinia Park, wearing the number 51. He became one of a special group of footballers by scoring a goal on debut with his first kick, but otherwise had a quiet match with seven touches.

The following season, Hocking's guernsey number was changed to 32, which he would wear for the remainder of his career, but only played three games in the second half of the season.

It would not be until Malcolm Blight took over as coach in 1989 that Hocking would play regular football and establish his place in the team. That year Geelong became the glamour team of the competition, twice kicking a score of over 200 points and drawing fans to games with their flamboyant, all-out attacking brand of football.

Hocking represented Victoria on numerous occasions in the State of Origin series and played in four losing Grand Final sides (1989, 1992, 1994, 1995).

Hocking was considered unlucky not to win the Brownlow Medal, due to his many close finishes, finishing amongst the top three vote-getters on four occasions, although twice as an ineligible player. Hocking's consistency over a period was recognised by the club in 1995 when after former-captain Bairstow's departure at the end of 1994, Hocking was given the captaincy role for the 1995 season. However early in the season, he stated his intentions to give up the captaincy to concentrate purely on playing. The role would be shared between three players; Ken Hinkley, Barry Stoneham and Gary Ablett.

Hocking's tenacity, hardness, consistency and quality was rewarded in 2001 when he was named ruck-rover in Geelong's Team of the Century; a great honour given the fact there have been other quality ruck-rovers in Geelong's history.

The Cats made it to the finals in 1997 but again were bundled out in straight sets.

By the middle of the 1999 AFL season, Geelong was in crisis on and off the field. After winning the first five games, the Cats would then lose the next nine in a row to effectively end any chance of making the finals. The club was also in deep financial trouble, owing a debt of around $7.5 million with a forecast operating loss of $750,000 for the season.
Midway through the nine-game losing streak, Cook approached Hocking with an unusual proposal. Uncle Ben's, the parent company of cat food label Whiskas at the time, would provide a financial incentive for the club if a Cats player was willing to change his name to "Whiskas" for one game. Hocking agreed to the offer and changed his name by deed-poll to "Whiskas" for one week. He announced this on The Footy Show. 
The incident was met with mixed reaction in the football world. When asked about his publicity stunt, Hocking commented:

I see it as a great thing for the footy club and Whiskas. It is just a light-hearted thing and from a commercial point of view to help get the club out of strife.

The AFL refused to acknowledge Hocking's name change and continued to use his original name on team lists. The League's reasoning was that the name change, although temporary, threatened to bring the game into disrepute. Geelong ended up losing the upcoming match against , and Hocking was off the field injured by three-quarter time, but the financial incentive, which has to date not been publicly disclosed, went some way to helping the club's financial situation.

Hocking retired at the end of the 2001 AFL season after playing 274 games, which at the time was the third-highest number of games for Geelong.  He was inducted into the Australian Football Hall of Fame on 8 March 2008.

Coaching career

Peel Thunder
After his playing career, which ended in 2001, Hocking moved into coaching. In 2005, he coached Peel Thunder Football Club in the WAFL, a team which was struggling and managed to win just 4 games for the year in 2005. In one match, Hocking employed a tactic where every player on the Peel team was stationed in defence for a centre-bounce. Known as a "full-flood", this was viewed as a farcical situation, and one that Hocking wanted to use with his team down by a massive margin. Hocking has promised never to use the tactic again, and has said that in this one instance, it was appropriate for the circumstance.

Geelong Falcons
In 2006, Hocking was the coach for the Geelong Falcons Under 18s side.

Port Adelaide
On 6 August 2012, he was appointed caretaker senior coach for the remainder of the 2012 season when Matthew Primus was sacked following the Round 19 loss to AFL newcomer . At the time of his appointment, Hocking felt unsure whether he wanted to continue as senior coach for the following season, and declared that while he had limited time to work with, he promised to foster an uncompromising attitude in the playing group:

"The expectation's not a win–loss one, it's just about gaining some respect back from our members and our supporters. It'll be a simple plan, you'll just need to play very aggressively and compete when it's your turn. There will be guidelines, benchmarks for those sorts of things that we're looking for in the game and that's all the players over the next four weeks will be judged on."

Hocking then decided against applying for the full-time role as senior coach of Port Adelaide at the end of the 2012 season, on 4 September 2012 and was replaced by Ken Hinkley as Port Adelaide Football Club senior coach.

On 4 October 2013, Hocking was announced as the SANFL senior coach of Port Adelaide, a position he held in 2014 and 2015 before returning to be an assistant coach at Port Adelaide's AFL squad. Hocking left Port Adelaide at the end of the 2016 season. 

In 2020, Port veteran and football media personality Kane Cornes recalled Hocking's first address to the players as senior coach on the day of his appointment in 2012 and the brutal training session at Grange Beach early the following morning:

It’s 4am in the morning at Grange Beach and I’ve never seen the ocean put on an uglier display. There was waves crashing over, it was as cold as you can imagine. Buddha said ‘Strip down we’re about to pay the price’, so we all got into our budgie smugglers or board shorts ... usually when coaches have this sort of quick dip you do a few duck dives and get out but this was completely different. We stayed out in that freezing cold water for over an hour at 4am and it is honestly the coldest that I have ever been, to the point where you really question whether you wanted to keep doing this, that’s how depressing it was to turn up to a footy club when you lose.

South Adelaide 

In 2017, Hocking was appointed senior coach of the South Adelaide Panthers Football Club in the SANFL for 2 years.

Collingwood 

At the end of 2017, Hocking returned to the AFL by accepting a position as assistant coach at Collingwood for the 2018 season. He was appointed senior coach of the club's VFL (reserves) side ahead of the 2020 season.

Leopold 

2022, Started coaching at Leopold Football Club in Geelong.

Personal life
Hocking and his wife Melina have three children - daughters Tayla and Chelsea, and son Lochlan, who joined the Geelong Falcons in 2019.

Statistics

Playing statistics

|-
|- style="background-color: #EAEAEA"
! scope="row" style="text-align:center" | 1987
|style="text-align:center;"|
| 51 || 6 || 2 || 1 || 41 || 26 || 67 || 10 || 7 || 0.3 || 0.2 || 6.8 || 4.3 || 11.2 || 1.7 || 1.2 || 0
|-
! scope="row" style="text-align:center" | 1988
|style="text-align:center;"|
| 32 || 3 || 0 || 0 || 26 || 17 || 43 || 7 || 4 || 0.0 || 0.0 || 8.7 || 5.7 || 14.3 || 2.3 || 1.3 || 0
|- style="background-color: #EAEAEA"
! scope="row" style="text-align:center" | 1989
|style="text-align:center;"|
| 32 || 26 || 24 || 12 || 285 || 217 || 502 || 81 || 56 || 0.9 || 0.5 || 11.0 || 8.3 || 19.3 || 3.1 || 2.2 || 12
|-
! scope="row" style="text-align:center" | 1990
|style="text-align:center;"|
| 32 || 21 || 14 || 12 || 278 || 204 || 482 || 60 || 40 || 0.7 || 0.6 || 13.2 || 9.7 || 23.0 || 2.9 || 1.9 || 0
|- style="background-color: #EAEAEA"
! scope="row" style="text-align:center" | 1991
|style="text-align:center;"|
| 32 || 25 || 41 || 28 || 362 || 265 || 627 || 70 || 47 || 1.6 || 1.1 || 14.5 || 10.6 || 25.1 || 2.8 || 1.9 || 19
|-
! scope="row" style="text-align:center" | 1992
|style="text-align:center;"|
| 32 || 20 || 19 || 18 || 235 || 230 || 465 || 77 || 43 || 1.0 || 0.9 || 11.8 || 11.5 || 23.3 || 3.9 || 2.2 || 0
|- style="background-color: #EAEAEA"
! scope="row" style="text-align:center" | 1993
|style="text-align:center;"|
| 32 || 18 || 18 || 17 || 284 || 186 || 470 || 74 || 31 || 1.0 || 0.9 || 15.8 || 10.3 || 26.1 || 4.1 || 1.7 || 17
|-
! scope="row" style="text-align:center" | 1994
|style="text-align:center;"|
| 32 || 24 || 16 || 20 || 338 || 273 || 611 || 85 || 48 || 0.7 || 0.8 || 14.1 || 11.4 || 25.5 || 3.5 || 2.0 || 20
|- style="background-color: #EAEAEA"
! scope="row" style="text-align:center" | 1995
|style="text-align:center;"|
| 32 || 21 || 15 || 8 || 270 || 216 || 486 || 77 || 49 || 0.7 || 0.4 || 12.9 || 10.3 || 23.1 || 3.7 || 2.3 || 17
|-
! scope="row" style="text-align:center" | 1996
|style="text-align:center;"|
| 32 || 23 || 21 || 15 || 313 || 270 || 583 || 85 || 66 || 0.9 || 0.7 || 13.6 || 11.7 || 25.3 || 3.7 || 2.9 || 19
|- style="background-color: #EAEAEA"
! scope="row" style="text-align:center" | 1997
|style="text-align:center;"|
| 32 || 20 || 27 || 9 || 255 || 192 || 447 || 80 || 49 || 1.4 || 0.5 || 12.8 || 9.6 || 22.4 || 4.0 || 2.5 || 2
|-
! scope="row" style="text-align:center" | 1998
|style="text-align:center;"|
| 32 || 17 || 12 || 4 || 234 || 170 || 404 || 61 || 40 || 0.7 || 0.2 || 13.8 || 10.0 || 23.8 || 3.6 || 2.4 || 14
|- style="background-color: #EAEAEA"
! scope="row" style="text-align:center" | 1999
|style="text-align:center;"|
| 32 || 12 || 7 || 4 || 158 || 105 || 263 || 48 || 18 || 0.6 || 0.3 || 13.2 || 8.8 || 21.9 || 4.0 || 1.5 || 5
|-
! scope="row" style="text-align:center" | 2000
|style="text-align:center;"|
| 32 || 21 || 17 || 3 || 255 || 217 || 472 || 70 || 59 || 0.8 || 0.1 || 12.1 || 10.3 || 22.5 || 3.3 || 2.8 || 7
|- style="background-color: #EAEAEA"
! scope="row" style="text-align:center" | 2001
|style="text-align:center;"|
| 32 || 17 || 10 || 9 || 122 || 128 || 250 || 45 || 53 || 0.6 || 0.5 || 7.2 || 7.5 || 14.7 || 2.6 || 3.1 || 1
|- class="sortbottom"
! colspan=3| Career
! 274
! 243
! 160
! 3456
! 2716
! 6172
! 930
! 610
! 0.9
! 0.6
! 12.6
! 9.9
! 22.5
! 3.4
! 2.2
! 133
|}

Coaching statistics

|- style="background-color: #EAEAEA"
! scope="row" style="text-align:center; font-weight:normal" | 2012
|style="text-align:center;"|
| 4 || 0 || 3 || 1 || 12.5% ||  || 
|- style="background-color: #EAEAEA"
|- class="sortbottom"
! colspan=2| Career totals
! 4
! 0
! 3
! 1
! 12.5%
! colspan=2|
|}

Honours
Inducted into Australian Football Hall of Fame in 2008
All-Australian Team (1991, 1993, 1994, 1996)
Geelong Team of the Century (Ruck-Rover)
Carji Greeves Medal (1991, 1993, 1994, 1996) (club record)
Brownlow Medal top 3 (3rd 1991, 1994)
Brownlow Medal most votes for Geelong (1991, 1993, 1994, 1995, 1996, 1998)

References

Bibliography

External links

1968 births
Living people
Geelong Football Club players
Carji Greeves Medal winners
All-Australians (AFL)
Victorian State of Origin players
Australian rules footballers from Victoria (Australia)
Peel Thunder Football Club coaches
Port Adelaide Football Club coaches
Port Adelaide Football Club (SANFL) coaches
Australian Football Hall of Fame inductees
Cobram Football Club players